William Gardner Sams (1792-1871) was appointed Under-Sheriff of Hobart in 1831 and later Sheriff and Commissioner of Insolvency of Launceston, Tasmania in 1840 . He was also one of fifteen investors in the pastoral company Port Phillip Association which played a key role in the foundation of the city of Melbourne.

Sams was appointed as a Page to Duke of Kent, father of Queen Victoria. He held the rank of Lieutenant and was a member of London Stock Exchange.

He immigrated to Van Diemens Land (later Tasmania) in 1825. He received a grant of land near Westbury.  

In 1838 he was a founding member of the Melbourne Cricket Club and played in their third match as a 'Batchelor' making 18 not out. He was buried in Melbourne General Cemetery.

References
Australian Biographical and Genealogical Record Series (1788-1841) edited by J. T. Spurway Published by A.B.G.R. Sydney 1992

1792 births
1871 deaths
People from Hobart
Melbourne Cricket Club cricketers
Burials at Melbourne General Cemetery